Tellamendi, also referred to as Belamendi, is a mountain situated in the Basque Mountains in the Álava province of Basque Country in Spain. It is situated at the base of Anboto (1331 m) as part of the grassy mountain range towards the south-west that comes off Zabalaundi (895 m). The range shifts direction after reaching Tellamendi to the north towards Besaide.

Cross 

The top of Tellamendi is adorned by a large cross easily visible from the town of Aramaio and the surrounding area. The original cross was constructed over the course of a few months starting on July 31, 1935. Upon its completion, it was transported with the help of oxen from nearby farmhouses and raised at the top of the mountain on September 15, 1935. The cross was inscribed with the following Basque passage:

The cross avoided any significant damage for 50 years and was largely unscathed by the Spanish Civil War and the Spanish Republic, though sometime between the raising of the cross and 1937 the inscription was damaged. This changed when the Spanish Civil Guard was called in on January 1, 1977 to handle the disposal of a 4 kg dynamite explosive placed next to a Basque flag. It was determined that the device could not be disarmed safely, and so was intentionally detonated. The detonation completely ruined the cross, which upset many of the people of Aramaio who were proud of the cross and all that it survived. They staged demonstrations demanding the reconstruction of the cross. On March 15, 1977, a second cross was erected upon the ruins of the first with an additional inscription plate, added adjacent to the recovered inscription of the first, reading:

References

Mountains of the Basque Country (autonomous community)
Geography of Álava